Wetzel’s Pretzels is an American chain of fast-food restaurants, specializing in pretzels and hot dogs. The chain has more than 370 locations across the United States, Canada and Central America, mostly located in shopping malls, airports, theme parks, and stadia; plus, as of recently, food trucks. The company is headquartered in Pasadena, California.

History
Wetzel’s Pretzels was founded in 1994 by Rick Wetzel and Bill Phelps in Pasadena, California. The chain's first location opened that year at the South Bay Galleria in nearby Redondo Beach. Its name was inspired by childhood taunts used by Wetzel's classmates.

In 1997, Wetzel and Phelps took on multiple investors, including John Davis and Gary L. Wilson. Wilson's connections to Disney paved the way for the chain to open locations at Disneyland and Walt Disney World.

Los Angeles-based private equity firm Levine Leichtman Capital Partners Inc. bought a majority stake in the company in 2007 for an undisclosed amount. Phelps still owns a 20% share, while Wetzel holds a smaller stake.

In October 2016, Levine Leichtman Capital Partners sold majority stake to Dallas-based private equity firm CenterOak Partners LLC. after holding the majority stake for 9 years.

In 2019, Phelps was succeeded as CEO by Jennifer Schuler.

Menu

Food
Wetzel’s menu is centered around its namesake pretzels along with hot dogs and lemonade. Their signature pretzels come in various flavors such as the Wetzel’s Original (buttered or unbuttered), cinnamon sugar, pepperoni and more. Guests can also choose Bitz, more snackable pretzel bites, available in Original, Cinn-a-bitz or Pizza Bitz (with pepperoni). Other pretzel items range from the full-sized Wetzel Dog, an all-beef hotdog wrapped in pretzel or Dog Bites and Cheesy Dog Bites, the bite-sized iteration.

Beverages
Wetzel’s is known for its fresh and frozen lemonades, which are available in original and strawberry flavors. They also offer a variety of other refreshing drinks such as granitas and were the first restaurant in the snack category to introduce boba popping pearls to the menu, with flavors like Cherry and Mango.

References

External links

Restaurants established in 1994
1994 establishments in California
Companies based in Los Angeles County, California
Restaurants in California
Fast-food chains of the United States
Restaurant chains in the United States
Restaurants in Greater Los Angeles
Pretzels